Gora pri Komendi is a settlement east of Komenda in the Upper Carniola region of Slovenia.

The Slovene writer and editor Ivo Zorman was born in the village in 1926.

Name
The name of the settlement was changed from Gora to Gora pri Komendi in 1955.

References

External links

Gora pri Komendi on Geopedia

Populated places in the Municipality of Komenda